Frýdlant nad Ostravicí is a town in Frýdek-Místek District in the Moravian-Silesian Region of the Czech Republic. It has about 9,800 inhabitants.

Administrative parts
Frýdlant nad Ostravicí is made up of three town parts and villages: Frýdlant, Lubno and Nová Ves.

Geography
Frýdlant nad Ostravicí is located in the Moravian-Silesian Foothills, the southern part of the municipal territory extends into the Moravian-Silesian Beskids. The town lies on the Ostravice River, at its confluence with Čeladenka Stream. The left bank with Frýdlant lies in the historical land of Moravia, the right bank with the villages of Lubno and Nová Ves lies in Czech Silesia.

History
The first written mention of Frýdlant is from 1395. The town was founded in the second half of 14th century during German Ostsiedlung. It was established as a market town that was supposed to be the local centre of trade and handicrafts. In 1402, Frýdlant was sold by lords of Kravaře to Przemyslaus I Noszak, Duke of Cieszyn and joined to Duchy of Teschen. Frýdlant found itself on the periphery, lost its position and became a mere village. The economy was also hit by the Hussite Wars.

In the 16th century, Frýdlant was sold to the Olomouc Bishopric and became part of the Hukvaldy estate. It was the impetus for the re-development of crafts. In 1625, the village received various privileges from the bishop Franz von Dietrichstein. During the Thirty Years' War, Frýdlant suffered from frequent army crossings.

Between 1646 and 1648, the first hammer mills were built and Frýdland gradually became a centre of ironworks. The village later known as Nová Ves was founded near the hammer mills in 1647. In 1675, blast furnaces were built. Thanks to the development of the ironworks and the prosperous paper mill, the village was promoted by Maria Theresa to the market town again in 1775.

In 1871 the railroad was built. Large fires in 1886 and 1890 damaged the market town severely. In 1948, Frýdland was promoted to a town.

Demographics

Education
Two gymnasiums are located in Frýdlant nad Ostravicí, the public Frýdlant nad Ostravicí Gymnasium and the private Beskydy Mountain Academy.

Sights

The landmark of the town is the Church of Saint Bartholomew, built in 1672–1690. Other monuments at the town square are the neo-Renaissance town hall from 1894 and a Baroque Marian column with a rare statue of the Virgin Mary of Carmel from 1731.

The monastery of the Sisters of Mercy of St. Charles Borromeo with a neo-Romanesque chapel dates from the second half of the 19th century. Today it is used as a retirement home. There are also several original wooden houses that are reminiscent of the original appearance of the town.

Notable people
Dominik Trčka (1886–1959), Catholic priest and martyr
Ferdiš Duša (1888–1958), artist
Petr Faldyna (born 1976), footballer

Twin towns – sister cities

Frýdlant nad Ostravicí is twinned with:

 Debrzno, Poland
 Dravograd, Slovenia
 Friedland, Mecklenburg-Vorpommern, Germany
 Friedland, Lower Saxony, Germany
 Friedland, Brandenburg, Germany
 Frýdlant, Czech Republic
 Korfantów, Poland
 Mieroszów, Poland
 Mirosławiec, Poland
 Pravdinsk, Russia
 Radeburg, Germany
 Turzovka, Slovakia

References

External links

Frýdlantsko-Beskydy Microregion

Cities and towns in the Czech Republic
Populated places in Frýdek-Místek District